84 Avenue Foch was the Parisian headquarters of the Sicherheitsdienst (SD), the counter-intelligence branch of the SS during the German occupation of Paris in World War II.

Avenue Foch is a wide residential boulevard in the 16th arrondissement that connects the Arc de Triomphe with the Porte Dauphine on the border with the Bois de Boulogne. During the German occupation of Northern France, the buildings at numbers 82 and 86, either side of 84, were also commandeered by the German occupation forces.

Counter espionage activities

Number 84 was used for the interrogation of allied SOE agents captured in France. Prisoners were regularly brought to the building from Fresnes prison on the outskirts of the city.

The second floor was used by the SD's wireless unit known as Section IV. It was under the control of Dr. Josef Goetz. The SD used captured allied wireless sets to transmit bogus coded messages in attempts to flush out resistance groups. The operation was colloquially known as Funkspiel (the 'radio game').

The third floor was used by SS-Standartenführer Helmut Knochen, who was appointed as senior commander of security in Paris in 1940. In 1942, Knochen's jurisdiction stretched from northern France to Belgium. He was involved in the deportation of French Jews to concentration camps.

The fourth floor was used by SS-Sturmbannführer Josef Kieffer, the commander of number 84, as an office and private quarters. His assistants, SS officer's Ernst Misselwitz and Heinrich Meiners, also had an office on this floor.

On the fifth (top) floor contained a guardroom, an interpreter's office, and cells for prisoners under interrogation.

A senior interrogator at number 84 was Ernest Vogt, a Swiss-German civilian who since 1940 had been attached to the SD as a civil auxiliary in the capacity of translator and interpreter.

See also
 Carlingue, French auxiliaries working for the RSHA
 Peter Churchill, a British secret agent was tortured and held here.
 Harold Cole, a British traitor who served the SD and Gestapo in occupied France.
 Ernst Misselwitz Head of Gestapo - Reich Security Main Office (RSHA) at 84 Avenue Foch
 Pierre Brossolette, a notable French Resistance leader, killed himself by leaping from the sixth floor of 84 Avenue Foch.

References

Foch, Avenue
History of Paris
Buildings and structures in the 16th arrondissement of Paris